Sapphire June Mauricienne Cooper (born 11 March 1968 in Napier, New Zealand) is a former field hockey player from New Zealand, who finished in eight position with the National Women's Field Hockey Team, nicknamed The Black Sticks, at the 1992 Summer Olympics in Barcelona.

References

External links
 

New Zealand female field hockey players
Olympic field hockey players of New Zealand
Field hockey players at the 1992 Summer Olympics
1968 births
Living people
Sportspeople from Napier, New Zealand